Martin Nuka Lennert Pedersen (born 24 May 1988) is a Danish cricketer.  Pedersen is a right-handed batsman who bowls right-arm medium pace.  He was born at Sisimiut, Qeqqata, Greenland.

Career
Having represented Denmark at Under-19 level and for Denmark A, Pedersen was selected in 2010 to play for Denmark in the European Cricket Championship Division One.  The following year he was part of Denmark's squad for World Cricket League Division Three in Hong Kong, making his full international debut against Italy.  He made a total of six appearances during the tournament.

In March 2012, Denmark took part in the World Twenty20 Qualifier in the United Arab Emirates, with Pedersen selected for the tournament.  He made his Twenty20 debut during it against Canada at the Sheikh Zayed Cricket Stadium.  He made two further appearances during the competition, against Papua New Guinea and Oman, scoring 28 runs and taking 2 wickets.

References

External links
Martin Pedersen at ESPNcricinfo
Martin Pedersen at CricketArchive

1988 births
Living people
People from Sisimiut
Danish cricketers
Greenlandic sportspeople
Greenlandic sportsmen